The 1920–21 Southern Branch Cubs men's basketball team represented the Southern Branch of the University of California during the 1920–21 NCAA men's basketball season and were members of the Southern California Intercollegiate Athletic Conference. The cubs were led by second year head coach Fred Cozens who also served as Athletic Director. They finished the regular season with a record of 9–2 and were conference champions with a record of 9–0.

Roster

Schedule

|-
!colspan=9 style=|Regular Season

Source

Notes

References

UCLA Bruins men's basketball seasons
Southern Branch Cubs Basketball
Southern Branch Cubs Basketball
Southern Branch